Žirovski Vrh Svetega Antona is a dispersed settlement above Gorenja Vas in the Municipality of Gorenja Vas–Poljane in the Upper Carniola region of Slovenia.

Name
The name of the settlement was changed from Žirovski Vrh Svetega Antona (literally, 'Žiri Peak of Saint Anthony') to Žirovski Vrh nad Gorenjo vasjo (literally, 'Žiri Peak above Gorenja Vas') in 1955. The name was changed on the basis of the 1948 Law on Names of Settlements and Designations of Squares, Streets, and Buildings as part of efforts by Slovenia's postwar communist government to remove religious elements from toponyms. The name Žirovski Vrh Svetega Antona was restored in 1994.

History

The Rupnik Line,  a line of fortifications and weapons installations, was built in the area in the 1930s. Several pillboxes from the line are preserved in the village's territory.

References

External links

Žirovski Vrh Svetega Antona on Geopedia

Populated places in the Municipality of Gorenja vas-Poljane